Kim Gwi-hyeon  (born January 4, 1990) is a South Korean footballer.

He was member of Club Atlético Vélez Sársfield academy, and played for Argentine Primera División side Club Atlético Vélez Sársfield.

References

External links
 Profile at Velez Sarsfield
 

1990 births
Living people
South Korean footballers
South Korean expatriate footballers
South Korean expatriate sportspeople in Argentina
Expatriate footballers in Argentina
Club Atlético Vélez Sarsfield footballers
Daegu FC players
Gyeongju Citizen FC players
Al-Nasr SC (Salalah) players
Al Ahli SC (Doha) players
Argentine Primera División players
K League 1 players
K League 2 players
Expatriate footballers in Oman
Expatriate footballers in Iran
Expatriate footballers in Qatar
Association football midfielders
Qatar Stars League players
Persian Gulf Pro League players